"The Forget-Me-Knot" is the first episode of the sixth series of the 1960s cult British spy-fi television series The Avengers, starring Patrick Macnee and Diana Rigg, and introducing Linda Thorson as Tara King. Its first broadcast was on the US ABC network on 20 March 1968 (half way through the third US season). Its first UK broadcast was on 25 September 1968 by Thames Television, who commissioned this series of the show for the ITV network. The episode was directed by James Hill, and written by Brian Clemens.

Plot
Agent Sean Mortimer arrives at Steed's flat with what appears to be a severe case of amnesia. Crucially, Mortimer does remember that there is a traitor in the organisation. Co-opting trainee agent 69, Tara King, Steed and Mrs Peel uncover a plot to infiltrate the organisation by means of a potentially devastating memory-wiping drug.

Cast
Patrick Macnee as John Steed
Diana Rigg as Emma Peel
Linda Thorson as Tara King
Patrick Kavanagh as Sean Mortimer
Patrick Newell as Mother
Jeremy Burnham as Simon Filson
Jeremy Young as George Burton
Alan Lake as Karl
Douglas Sheldon as Brad
John Lee as Dr Soames
Beth Owen as Sally
Leon Lissek as Taxi Driver
Tony Thawton as Jenkins
Edward Higgins as Giles
Paul Weston as Peter Peel (uncredited)

Production
"The Forget-Me-Knot" was not originally part of the planned sixth season of The Avengers. Having decided to cast Linda Thorson as Steed's new sidekick Tara King, producer John Bryce had started filming episodes with the character already in place and - as with her predecessors - no introduction. However Bryce was fired midway through production of the third episode, and the previous series producers, Albert Fennell and Brian Clemens, were re-hired. Clemens abandoned the episode whose production was underway (entitled "The Great, Great Britain Crime", scenes of which were later salvaged for the episode entitled "Homicide and Old Lace"). Instead, he decided that there needed to be a continuity explanation for the replacement of Mrs Peel by Tara King, and set about hastily developing a storyline which would account for this. Diana Rigg's scenes were shot in four days in December 1967 with production completed the following month. A "handover" scene featuring both characters was filmed on the last day of Rigg's contract with ABC Television on 19 December 1967.

As this episode features both Peel from Series 5 and King from Series 6, some releases and some reference books treat this episode as the 25th episode of Series 5, even though that is not how it was originally broadcast in the UK.

References

External links

Episode overview on The Avengers Forever! website

1968 British television episodes
The Avengers (season 6) episodes